Plouray is a commune in the Morbihan department of Brittany in north-western France. Inhabitants of Plouray are called in French Plouraysiens.

Population
Plouray's population peaked at 1,991 in 1936 and declined to 1,062 in 2019. This represents a 46.7% decrease in total population since the peak census figure.

Geography

Historically, the village belongs to Vannetais. Plouray is border by Glomel and Mellionnec to the north, by Ploërdut to the east, by Saint-Tugdual and Priziac to the south and by Langonnet to the west.

Map

Environment

Planning a base for automotive recycling by the French company GDE, a subsidiary of the industrial group Trafigura, which sent the ship Probo-Koala to Abidjan in 2006 (see 2006 Ivory Coast toxic waste spill). The proposal was defeated and no longer applies, however recent pollution of the rivers has destroyed a mature fish population and is expected to take several years to recover (article in the Telegram July 2017).

Gallery

See also
Communes of the Morbihan department

References

External links

 Mayors of Morbihan Association 

Communes of Morbihan